FC Guria is a Georgian association football club from Lanchkhuti, which competes in Liga 3, the third tier of the national league.

Being one of the strongest Georgian teams in the late 1980s and early 1990s, Guria have taken part in the Soviet Top league, also won the national Cup and played fifteen seasons in Umaglesi Liga, twice claiming silver medals.

History

Early period
Formed in 1924 as FC Kimi, the team ceased to exist after the start of World War 2 and resumed functioning in 1952 under the name "Kolmeurne".

In 1960 the club was renamed as Guria. The next year they gained a first title by becoming champions of the republican league. During the subsequent decade the team won the Georgian Cup three times and the domestic league two more times, in 1966 and 1971, which enabled them to advance to the Soviet Association football.

1972–1979: in the Soviet second league
Starting from 1972 Guria played in the Second League, the third tier of the Soviet football league, for seven years.

 *Note: Lost promotion play-offs to Uralmash Sverdlovsk

Overall results shown by Guria in II League are the following:

Guria's remarkable progress was largely attributed to Shalva Kakabadze, who worked as head coach for record twenty years continuously from 1959 until 1980, and local government chairman Evgrapi Shevardnadze, brother of the Soviet Communist Party leader in Georgia Eduard Shevardnadze.

1980-1986: Road to the top flight
After the winning season in 1979 Guria were promoted to the First League, where they played for another seven consecutive years. 

Source

The very fact of promotion to the Soviet Top League for the team representing a provincial town seemed amazing. Football fervour around Guria grew so high that in most cases not a single seat was available during their matches and some youngsters would climb up trees around the stadium to watch their favourite team. The pitch invasion during the 2–1 win over fierce rivals FC Daugava Riga resulted in disqualification of the stadium for three matches. For this reason the final home game of the season against Yuri Semin's Lokomotive Moscow (1-0) was held in Batumi in front of 20,000 spectators.

Under head coach Begi Sikharulidze some players especially contributed to this huge achievement:
Besik Pridonashvili with all 46 games played and 27 goals scored; Teimuraz Chkhaidze - 44 (8);  Murman Akopian - 43 (7); Badri Danelia - 43 (1); Levan Melikia - 41; Vakhtang Kopaleishvili - 40 (16); Sergey Shvetsov - 40 (1); Enuki Tevzadze - 39 (5); Tariel Ebanoidze - 37 (1); Gigla Imnadze - 36; Alexander Kondratiev - 36; Merab Tevzadze - 30 (1); Gia Giligashvili - 26;
Karlo Mchedlidze - 12; Davit Ugrelidze - 11 (5).

1987: the Top league
Straight away after the promotion the football ground underwent a significant reconstruction and eventually the capacity of stadium in a town with 9,021 residents as of 1987 reached 22,000.
 
Between 1983/84 and 1987/88 seasons the USSR occupied a second place after Italy in UEFA ranking, therefore, the Soviet Top League was a tough challenge for Guria. Being regarded as a decent home team, Guria beat Kairat Alma-Ata 2–0, Neftchi 1–0, Dinamo Minsk 2–1, Dinamo Moscow 2-1 and Ararat Yerevan 2–0, also played goalless draws against Dinamo Kiev, Dinamo Tbilisi and future bronze medal holders Zalgiris, although poor results in away games doomed the club for relegation.

1988-89: Promotion battles
Guria did not succeed in a new promotion attempt, finishing in the 4th place in 1988, but the team still made headlines with a shock victory over Dinamo Kiev (2-1) in the Cup 1/16 finals. The next year the Gurians once again displayed their powerful home run by winning all 21 games held in Lanchkhuti and earned a place in the Soviet Top League as runners-up of the 1989 season.
 
However, Guria were no longer destined to play again in the Soviet championship. On 15 February 1990 Georgian Football Federation made a decision to break away from the Soviet Football Federation, withdraw all the teams from the Soviet leagues and form its own national championship with immediate effect.

Since 1990: Georgian leagues
By entering Umaglesi Liga competition a new stage opened up for Guria. First several years they remained high-flying, winning the Georgian Cup title in 1990 and silver medals in 1990 and 1991. Later the decline started which saw the club moving up and down the first three divisions several times.

Their very name was subjected to changes, becoming Guria-Lokomotive-2 after the merger with Locomotive's reserve team in 2001, and Guria-2000 in 2008. In 2009 the team regained their popular name.

In the 2016 season Guria played in the top Georgian division, but within two years they slumped to Liga 3. Although the team managed to go up for 2019, their tenure there did not last longer than one season.

Throughout the shortened 2020 season Guria appeared poised for promotion. Yet, decisive last two games lost to direct rivals spelled failure for their main goal. In contrast, a year later the team mostly stayed inside the drop zone, although due to the points picked up close to the end they barely escaped yet another relegation.

Seasons
{|class="wikitable sortable" style="text-align: center"
! Season
! League
! Pos
! P
! W
! D
! L
! GF
! GA
! Pts
!Cup
|-
|1987
|Top League
|bgcolor=LimeGreen|16
|align=right|30||align=right|5||align=right|8||align=right|17
|align=right|18||align=right|38||align=right|18
|
|-
|1988
|First League
|4
|align=right|42||align=right|23||align=right|7||align=right|12
|align=right|71||align=right|44||align=right|53
|
|-
|1989
|First League
|bgcolor=silver|2
|align=right|42||align=right|27||align=right|9||align=right|6
|align=right|78||align=right|39||align=right|63
|
|-
|1990
|Umaglesi Liga
|bgcolor=silver|2
|align=right|34||align=right|22||align=right|6||align=right|6
|align=right|73||align=right|20||align=right|72
|bgcolor=Gold|Winner
|-
|1991
|Umaglesi Liga
|bgcolor=silver|2
|align=right|19||align=right|14||align=right|4||align=right|1
|align=right|38||align=right|15||align=right|46
| —
|-
|1991/92
|Umaglesi Liga
|4
|align=right|38||align=right|22||align=right|3||align=right|13
|align=right|89||align=right|56||align=right|69
|Round of 16
|-
|1992/93
|Umaglesi Liga
|12
|align=right|32||align=right|12||align=right|2||align=right|18
|align=right|37||align=right|57||align=right|38
|Round of 16
|-
|rowspan="2"|1993/94
|Umaglesi Liga West
| bgcolor=silver|2 
|align=right|14 ||align=right|9 ||align=right|0 ||align=right|5
|align=right|36 ||align=right|22 ||align=right|27
|rowspan="2"|Quarterfinals
|-
|Champ.Group
| 7 
|align=right|18 ||align=right|5 ||align=right|2 ||align=right|11
|align=right|30 ||align=right|50 ||align=right|17
|-
|1994/95
|Umaglesi Liga
|13
|align=right|30||align=right|8||align=right|6||align=right|16
|align=right|36||align=right|81||align=right|30
||Quarterfinals
|-
|1995/96
|Umaglesi Liga
|13
|align=right|30||align=right|9||align=right|0||align=right|21
|align=right|35||align=right|74||align=right|27
||Round of 32
|-
|1996/97
|Umaglesi Liga
|13
|align=right|30||align=right|10||align=right|3||align=right|17
|align=right|33||align=right|63||align=right|33
|Round of 16
|-
|1997/98
|Umaglesi Liga
|14
|align=right|30||align=right|6||align=right|9||align=right|15
|align=right|30||align=right|58||align=right|27
|Round of 16
|-
|1998/99
|Umaglesi Liga
|bgcolor=LimeGreen|16
|align=right|30||align=right|3||align=right|4||align=right|23
|align=right|34||align=right|87||align=right|13
||Round of 32
|-
|1999/00
|Pirveli Liga A
|8
|align=right|22 ||align=right|7 ||align=right|1 ||align=right|14
|align=right|36 ||align=right|45 ||align=right|22
||Round of 16
|-
|rowspan="2"|2000/01
|Pirveli Liga
|bgcolor=#F1A33F|3
|align=right|22 ||align=right|12 ||align=right|5 ||align=right|5
|align=right|31 ||align=right|25 ||align=right|41
|rowspan="2"|Fourth Round
|-
|Champ.Group
|bgcolor=Gold|1
|align=right| ||align=right| ||align=right| ||align=right|
|align=right| ||align=right| ||align=right|
|-
|2001/02
||Umaglesi Liga
|bgcolor=LimeGreen|10
|align=right|22 ||align=right|3 ||align=right|6 ||align=right|13
|align=right|14 ||align=right|44 ||align=right|15
|Quarterfinals
|-
|2002/03
|Pirveli Liga
|12
|align=right|30 ||align=right| 9||align=right|7 ||align=right|14
|align=right|32||align=right|44 ||align=right|34
|Second round
|-
|2003/04
|Pirveli Liga
|10
|align=right|30||align=right|13||align=right|6||align=right|11
|align=right|38||align=right|37||align=right|45
|First round
|-
|2004/05
|Pirveli Liga
|10
|align=right|30||align=right|10||align=right|8||align=right|12
|align=right|30||align=right|45||align=right|38
|First round
|-
|2005/06
|Pirveli Liga
|9
|align=right|34||align=right|14||align=right|5||align=right|15
|align=right|50||align=right|47||align=right|47
|Round of 32
|-
|2006/07
|Pirveli Liga
|bgcolor=LimeGreen|15
|align=right|34||align=right|8||align=right|7||align=right|19
|align=right|36||align=right|76||align=right|31
|First round
|-
|2007/08
|Meore Liga West
|bgcolor=Silver|2
|align=right|22 ||align=right|15 ||align=right|6 ||align=right|1
|align=right|49 ||align=right|17 ||align=right|51
|—
|-
|2008/09
|Pirveli Liga
|6
|align=right|14 ||align=right|7 ||align=right|2 ||align=right|5
|align=right|24 ||align=right|21 ||align=right|23
|Round of 16
|-
|2009/10
|Pirveli Liga
|4
|align=right|28||align=right|16||align=right|5||align=right|7
|align=right|53||align=right|32||align=right|53
|First round
|-
|2010/11
|Pirveli Liga
|6
|align=right|32||align=right|14||align=right|4||align=right|14
|align=right|50||align=right|59||align=right|46
|First round
|-
|2011/12
|Pirveli Liga B 
|bgcolor=silver|2
|align=right|18||align=right|12||align=right|3||align=right|3
|align=right|41||align=right|15||align=right|39
|Round of 32
|-
|2012/13
|Pirveli Liga A 
|bgcolor=Gold|1
|align=right|33||align=right|27||align=right|4||align=right|2
|align=right|86||align=right|20||align=right|85
||Quarterfinals
|-
|2013/14
|Umaglesi Liga
|6
|align=right|32||align=right|12||align=right|0||align=right|20
|align=right|31||align=right|53||align=right|36
|Round of 16
|-
|2014/15
|Umaglesi Liga
|9
|align=right|30||align=right|10||align=right|9||align=right|11
|align=right|38||align=right|43||align=right|39
|Round of 32
|-
|2015/16
|Umaglesi Liga
|11
|align=right|30||align=right|6||align=right|9||align=right|15
|align=right|28||align=right|49||align=right|27
|Round of 16
|-
|2016
|Umaglesi Liga White
|bgcolor=LimeGreen|6 
|align=right|12||align=right|3||align=right|2||align=right|7
|align=right|8||align=right|21||align=right|11
|Round of 16
|-
|2017
|Erovnuli Liga 2
|bgcolor=LimeGreen|8 
|align=right|36||align=right|11||align=right|4||align=right|21
|align=right|47||align=right|68||align=right|37
|Round of 16
|-
|2018
|Liga 3
|bgcolor=#F1A33F|3 
|align=right|38||align=right|21||align=right|10||align=right|7
|align=right|59||align=right|31||align=right|73
|Round of 8
|-
|2019
|Erovnuli Liga 2
|bgcolor=LimeGreen|8 
|align=right|36||align=right|10||align=right|6||align=right|20
|align=right|39||align=right|64||align=right|36
|Round of 16
|-
|2020
|rowspan=4|Liga 3
|5 
|align=right|18||align=right|8||align=right|2||align=right|8
|align=right|26||align=right|30||align=right|26
|First Round
|-
|2021
|11 
|align=right|26||align=right|8||align=right|5||align=right|13
|align=right|33||align=right|44||align=right|29
|Third Round
|-
|2022
|12 
|align=right|30||align=right|11||align=right|4||align=right|15
|align=right|42||align=right|49||align=right|37
|Quarterfinals
|-
|2023
|TBD
|align=right|0||align=right|0||align=right|0||align=right|0
|align=right|0||align=right|0||align=right|0
|TBD
|}
Overall, seasons spent in Georgian leagues since 1990:
 
• Umaglesi Liga (1st tier): 15

• Pirveli Liga / Erovnuli Liga 2 (2nd tier): 14

• Meore Liga /  Liga 3 (3rd tier): 5

Correct up to 2022 season

Club honours
 Georgian Soviet Championship:
Winners: 1961, 1966, 1971
Runners-up: 1960

 Georgian Soviet Cup:
 Winners: 1965, 1966, 1971 

 Soviet First League:
 Runners-up: 1986, 1989

 Soviet Second League:
 Winners: 1976, 1979

 Georgian Cup:
Winners: 1990

Umaglesi Liga
Runners-up: 1990, 1991

 Pirveli Liga: 
 Winners: 2000-01, 2012-2013 (West)

 Meore Liga:
 Runners-up: 2007-08
 Third place: 2018

Personal honours
  Otar Korghalidze – Top scorers – 14 goals, 1991 season
  Otar Korghalidze – Top scorers – 40 goals, 1991–92 season
  Zviad Endeladze – European Golden Boot – 40 goals, 1995-96 season (for Margveti Zestafoni)

In early 2020, by decree of the Georgian Ministry of Sport Begi Sikharulidze, Teimuraz Chkhaidze and Gigla Imnadze were awarded the Knight of Sport title for their distinguished contribution to Guria's victorious season in 1986.

A year later Begi Sikharulidze was awarded the title Honorary Citizen of Lanchkhuti.

Current squad 
As of April 2022

 

(C)

Former players

Topscorers by season

Managers

 Givi Imnaishvili (1952–53)
 Vladimer Narimanidze (1954–55)
 Viktor Berezhnoi (1956)
 Boris Chitaia (1957–58)
 Shalva Kakabadze (1959–79)
 Aleqsandre Kotrikadze (1980)
 Murtaz Khurtsilava (1981–82)
 Shalva Kakabadze (1983–84)
 Begi Sikharulidze (1985–86)
 Aleqsandre Kotrikadze (1986)
 Mikhail Fomenko (1987–90)
 Gigla Imnadze (1990)
 Murtaz Khurtsilava (1990–93)
 Teimuraz Chkhiadze (1993–94)
 Gigla Imnadze (1994–95)
 Begi Sikharulidze (1995–96)
 Boris Dudarov (1996)
 Gigla Imnadze (1996–97)
 Gia Tavadze (1997)
 Avtandil Nariashvili (Aug 1997–??)
 Davit Makharadze (22 July 2013– 18 September 2013)
 Roman Pokora (Sep – Dec 2013)
 Davit Makharadze (Jan - Aug 2014)
 Temur Loria (Aug 2014 - Apr 2015) 
 Gigla Imnadze (Apr - May 2015)
 Kakha Gogichaishvili (Aug - Sep 2015)
  Badri Kvaratskhelia (Sep 2015)
  Gia Chkhaidze (Oct - Dec 2015)
   Viktor Demidov (Feb - Apr 2016)
  Temur Makharadze (Apr- Aug 2016)
  Oleg Leshchinskiy (Aug - Nov 2016)
  Gigla Imnadze (Mar - May 2017)
  Gia Guruli (May - Oct 2017)
  Davit Makharadze (Oct 2017 Aug 2018) 
  Giorgi Oniani (Aug - Oct 2018)
  Giga Imedaishvili (Oct - Dec 2018)
  Tengiz Pataraia (Mar - Apr 2019)
  Giga Imedaishvili (May 2019)
 Gela Sanaia (May - Aug 2019) 
 Giorgi Chkhaidze (Aug 2019)
 Temur Loria (Sep 2019 - Mar 2020) 
  Levan Khomeriki/Ivane Makharadze (Apr 2020 - Feb 2021)
  Giga Imedaishvili (Feb - Sep 2021) 
  Giorgi Oniani (Oct 2021 – Jul 2022)
  Gigla Imnadze (since Aug 2022)

References

External links
 Profile on Soccerway
 Page on Facebook
 Guria, Georgian Public TV Documentaryin Georgian

Guria Lanchkhuti
Guria Lanchkhuti
1924 establishments in Georgia (country)
Soviet Top League clubs